Marcgravia dressleri is a species of Marcgravia. Marcgravia dressleri is native to Colombia.

References

Flora of Colombia